This partial list of city nicknames in Virginia compiles the aliases, sobriquets and slogans that cities in the U.S. state of Virginia are known by (or have been known by historically), officially and unofficially, to municipal governments, local people, outsiders or their tourism boards or chambers of commerce. 

City nicknames can establish a civic identity, help outsiders recognize a community, attract people to a community because of its nickname, promote civic pride, and build community unity. Nicknames and slogans that successfully create a new community "ideology or myth" are also believed to have economic value. This value is difficult to measure, but there are anecdotal reports of cities that have achieved substantial economic benefits by "branding" themselves by adopting new slogans.

Some unofficial nicknames are positive, while others are derisive. The unofficial nicknames listed here have been in use for a long time or have gained wide currency.
 Bristol – The Birthplace of Country Music (shares this nickname with Bristol, Tennessee)
 Charlottesville
Cville
So Very Virginia
 Colonial Beach – Oyster Capital of the Potomac
 Fredericksburg
 America's Most Historic City
 Where History Never Gets Old
 Harrisonburg – The Friendly City
 Honaker – Redbud Capital of the World
 Lexington
 The Paris of Southwest Virginia 
 Home of Hamric House 
 Lynchburg
 City of Seven Hills
 The Hill CityBarry Popik, Smoky City , barrypopik.com website, March 27, 2005
Newport News
Bad News
Norfolk – Life, Celebrated Daily
 Mermaid City, USA
 Portsmouth – P-Town
 Radford – The New River City
 Richmond 
 Capital of the South
 The River CityHistory: River City Observed , Discover Richmond website
 RVA
 Dirt City
 Roanoke
 Magic City
 Star City of the South
 Virginia Beach
Neptune City
The Resort City
VA Beach
 Williamsburg
 The Burg
 The Colonial Capital
 Thrilliamsburg
 Billysburg
 Winchester – Apple Capital of the World

See also
 List of city nicknames in the United States

References

Virginia cities and towns
Populated places in Virginia
City nicknames